Apostolic Church of Christ (Pentecostal) is a Pentecostal Christian denomination founded in North Carolina in 1969 by Johnnie Draft and Wallace Snow. Both these men had been members of the Church of God (Apostolic) prior to establishing this church. The only difference between the Apostolic Church of Christ (Pentecostal) and that from which it was founded is its organization, a centralized church polity. Authority is vested in the executive board, which owns all the church property.  This was a departure from the organization the Church of God (Apostolic) had, where an Overseer and an "International General Assembly" governs the church and its property. The Apostolic Church of Christ (Pentecostal) left the Church of God (Apostolic) under Overseer Charles W. Conn.

See also
 Apostolic Assemblies of Christ
 Apostolic Assembly of the Faith in Christ Jesus
 Apostolic Brethren
 Apostolic Church (denomination)
 Apostolic Faith Church
 Apostolic Gospel Church of Jesus Christ
 Apostolic Pentecostalism
 Free Apostolic Church of Pentecost
 International Apostolic Fellowship
 List of Christian denominations#Apostolic Churches – Irvingites
 List of Christian denominations#Oneness Pentecostalism
 Apostolic Overcoming Holy Church of God

References

Pentecostal denominations in North America
Christian organizations established in 1969
Christian new religious movements